Elisha Calor Hedden House is a historic home located at Webster, Jackson County, North Carolina. The house was built in 1910, and is a modest two-story, two bay, Queen Anne-style frame dwelling.  It has a hipped roof with projecting gable and cross-gables.  It features a one-story, hipped roof, wraparound porch supported by slender Doric order columns.  Also on the property is a contributing frame carriage house.

It was listed on the National Register of Historic Places in 1989.

References

Houses on the National Register of Historic Places in North Carolina
Queen Anne architecture in North Carolina
Houses completed in 1910
Houses in Jackson County, North Carolina
National Register of Historic Places in Jackson County, North Carolina